Sávio Roberto Juliao Figueiredo (born 30 April 1996), commonly known as Sávio Roberto, is a Brazilian footballer who plays as a midfielder for Finnish club HIFK.

Club career
On 11 January 2022, he signed a one-year deal with HIFK in Finland.

Career statistics

Club

Notes

References

1996 births
Living people
Brazilian footballers
Brazilian expatriate footballers
Association football midfielders
Esporte Clube Bahia players
Esporte Clube Ypiranga players
Lagarto Futebol Clube players
Clube Náutico Marcílio Dias players
Vitória F.C. players
Casa Pia A.C. players
Cianorte Futebol Clube players
C.D. Pinhalnovense players
HIFK Fotboll players
Campeonato Brasileiro Série B players
Primeira Liga players
Campeonato Brasileiro Série D players
Liga Portugal 2 players
Campeonato de Portugal (league) players
Brazilian expatriate sportspeople in Portugal
Expatriate footballers in Portugal
Brazilian expatriate sportspeople in Finland
Expatriate footballers in Finland
Sportspeople from Salvador, Bahia